Yangcheng Evening News or Ram City Evening News, also known as Yangcheng Evening Post or Ram City Evening Post, is a Chinese newspaper in the Standard Chinese language, national unified publication number CN44-0006 in Guangzhou, Guangdong, China.

History
The publication of Yangcheng Evening Post was started on October 1, 1957, in Guangzhou, China. The newspaper was forced to stop publication during the Cultural Revolution and resumed publication on February 15, 1980. Started from May 18, 1998, the paper became among several newspapers published by the Yangcheng Evening News Group.

Yangcheng Evening Post is one of the world's largest circulated newspapers: in 2008, its daily circulation was estimated to be 1,170,000, distributed mainly in the Pearl River Delta area in South China.

References

External links

 Yangcheng Evening News 

Daily newspapers published in China
Chinese-language newspapers (Simplified Chinese)
Evening newspapers
Mass media in Guangzhou
1957 establishments in China